Manuel Alejandro Pardo (born 9 September 1993) is an Italian motorcycle racer. In 2009 and 2010 he competed in the Red Bull MotoGP Rookies Cup.

Career statistics

Grand Prix motorcycle racing

By season

Races by year
(key)

References

External links
 

Living people
1993 births
Italian motorcycle racers
125cc World Championship riders
Sportspeople from Barcelona